Miguel Ángel Díaz Arévalo (born 27 January 1957) is a retired football player from El Salvador.

Club career
Nicknamed La Ardilla (Squirrel), Díaz started his career at Third Division side Alacranes, later renamed as Chalatenango, with whom he won promotion to the Second Division and later to the Primera División de Fútbol de El Salvador.

When they got relegated at the end of 1989 he moved to Luis Ángel Firpo where he played alongside Raúl Díaz Arce, and won two league titles.

He retired at Cojutepeque.

International career
He has represented his country in 1 FIFA World Cup qualification match and at the 1982 FIFA World Cup in Spain.

His final international game was a May 1989 friendly match against Chile.

Managerial career
He was coach of UES from 2005 through 2010, and took them from the Third Division to the Primera División de Fútbol de El Salvador.

Personal life
He is married to Elizabeth, his wife, and they have four children.

References

External links

1957 births
Living people
People from Chalatenango Department
Association football defenders
Salvadoran footballers
El Salvador international footballers
1982 FIFA World Cup players
C.D. Atlético Marte footballers
C.D. Chalatenango footballers
C.D. Luis Ángel Firpo footballers